Jean Domingue (born September 26, 1962) is a politician from Quebec, Canada. He was an Action démocratique du Québec (ADQ) Member of the National Assembly for the electoral district of Bellechasse from 2007 to 2008.

Domingue was born in Montreal, Quebec. He joined the ADQ in 2003.

Domingue was first elected in the 2007 election with 49% of the vote. Liberal incumbent Dominique Vien finished second with 34% of the vote. Domingue took office on April 12, 2007.

Prior to his political career, Domingue worked as an educator at a youth centre in Quebec City and was also the general manager of a youth house in the same region. He also occupied several positions at various youth development-related community organizations and associations.

Footnotes

External links
 

1962 births
Action démocratique du Québec MNAs
Living people
Politicians from Montreal
21st-century Canadian politicians